The year 2017 is the 14th year in the history of the Konfrontacja Sztuk Walki, a mixed martial arts promotion based in Poland. 2017 began with KSW 38.

List of events

KSW 38: Live in Studio 

KSW 38: Live in Studio was a mixed martial arts event held by Konfrontacja Sztuk Walki on April 7, 2017 at the Studio Apricor in Warsaw, Poland.

Background

Bonus awards 

The following fighters were awarded bonuses:
 Fight of the Night: Anzor Azhiev vs. Kamil Selwa
 Knockout of the Night: Maciej Kazieczko
 Submission of the Night: Artur Sowiński
 Performance of the Night: Grzegorz Szulakowski

Results

KSW 39: Colosseum 

KSW 39: Colosseum was a mixed martial arts event held by Konfrontacja Sztuk Walki on May 27, 2017 at the PGE Narodowy in Warsaw, Poland.

Background 
Former KSW Heavyweight Champion, Karol Bedorf, tore his Achilles' tendon and was unable to fight Michal Kita. He was replaced by Michal Andryszak.

KSW 39 became the 2nd highest MMA attendance record with 57,776, behind only the Pride FC: Shockwave event from 2002. It also beat UFC 193 attendance.

Bonus awards 

The following fighters were awarded bonuses:
 Fight of the Night: Mamed Khalidov vs. Borys Mańkowski
 Knockout of the Night: Marcin Rozalski
 Submission of the Night: Michał Andryszak

Results

KSW 40: Dublin 

KSW 40: Dublin was a mixed martial arts event held by Konfrontacja Sztuk Walki on October 22, 2017 at the 3Arena in Dublin, Ireland.

Background 
Anzor Azhiev was not able to fight due to food poisoning. Debutant Paweł Polityło faced Antun Račić.

Norman Parke missed his weight, at 70.8 kg. The fight between Parke and Gamrot was therefore a non-title fight. Parke was fined 30% of his purse for missing weight.

James McSweeney was not permitted to fight after he was not cleared by Safe MMA Ireland. Jay Silva stepped in as a replacement against Mariusz Pudzianowski in the main event.

Bonus awards 

The following fighters were awarded bonuses:
 Fight of the Night: David Zawada vs. Maciej Jewtuszko
 Knockout of the Night: Michał Materla
 Submission of the Night: Ariane Lipski

Results

KSW 41: Mankowski vs. Soldic 

 KSW 41: Mankowski vs. Soldic  was a mixed martial arts event held by Konfrontacja Sztuk Walki on December 23, 2017 at the Spodek in Katowice, Poland.

Background 
Dricus du Plessis is out of the KSW 41 main event due to a hand injury and Borys Mankowski will defend his welterweight title against Roberto Soldic.

Kleber Koike Erbst didn't make weight, the KSW featherweight belt is vacated. Artur Sowinski fights for the vacant featherweight title.

Bonus awards 

The following fighters were awarded bonuses:
 Fight of the Night: Marcin Wrzosek vs. Roman Szymański 
 Knockout of the Night: Michał Andryszak
 Submission of the Night: Grzegorz Szulakowski

Results

References 

2017 in mixed martial arts
Konfrontacja Sztuk Walki events
Konfrontacja Sztuk Walki events